The Wabash Tunnel is a former railway tunnel and presently an automobile tunnel through Mt. Washington in the city of Pittsburgh, Pennsylvania, United States. Constructed early in the 20th century by railroad magnate George J. Gould for the Wabash Railroad, it was closed to trains and cars between 1946 and 2004.

Operation as a railroad tunnel
Conceived in the late 1800s, the tunnel was built in 1903 for Gould's Wabash Pittsburgh Terminal Railway venture into Pittsburgh, which failed in 1908. It carried passenger trains into the city until 1931, and freight trains until 1946. After the end of train service, the tunnel sat empty for many years. The tunnel was once connected to the Wabash Bridge across the Monongahela River, but this was demolished in 1948, and was not replaced. Its two stone support piers remain in the river.

Conversion to a transitway
In the early 1970s Pittsburgh Regional Transit, then known as Port Authority, or PAT, spent   today) rebuilding the tunnel for the never-to-be-operational Skybus people mover system. (This project was to include a new Monongahela River bridge.)

Use as a bus garage
During this period, the tunnel was used to hold up to 87 of PAT's disused 1950s-era transit buses in reserve. The tunnel portals were reinforced to deter vandals, to the satisfaction of PAT's insurers. Despite this, in 1980, vandals gained access and smashed hundreds of windows and headlights on the two rows of buses parked inside.

Conversion to a roadway

By 1992, the Pennsylvania Department of Transportation (PennDOT) was considering using the Wabash Tunnel as a roadway to compensate for an upcoming closure of the Fort Pitt Tunnel. As part of the conversion to a roadway, the guideways for the Skybus system were removed and replaced with new paving and drainage. When awarded in 1994, the contract for this work was worth   today).

On July 23, 2003 PAT approved contracts for   today) to build high-occupancy vehicle (HOV) ramps and modernized the tunnel, as well as provide a 172-space park-and-ride lot along Woodruff Street. The little-used HOV lane was opened on December 27, 2004, running from West Carson Street on the South Side and through the tunnel to Woodruff Street in Mt. Washington. The Fort Pitt Tunnel to the west and the Squirrel Hill Tunnels to the east carry nearly all of the vehicular traffic heading downtown.

On November 6, 2013 the Federal Transit Administration lifted the car pool requirements to provide an alternate route for drivers, due to the two-year closure of outbound West Carson Street.

On February 24, 2017 PAT announced that the HOV restrictions had been waived permanently.

Operators

Originally built for the Wabash Railroad, the Pittsburgh and West Virginia Railroad acquired it along with most of the ex-Wabash-Railroad property in 1917.

The tunnel was sold in 1931 to Allegheny County for   today). The county intended to convert it to a road and use it to relieve the traffic congestion in the Liberty Tunnels, and in 1933 commissioned a $5000 study to investigate this concept.

, the tunnel was operated and maintained for PAT by Bruce & Merrilees, at an annual cost of $780,000.

Incidents
The tunnel's north portal was severely damaged in a 1925 landslide. The tunnel was temporarily closed due to fallen trees on July 19, 2012.

See also
Wabash Bridge
Wabash Pittsburgh Terminal – A large railroad terminal that was located in downtown, across the river from the tunnel portal.
West Busway – the project under which the tunnel was reopened for automobile traffic

References

External links

PortAuthority – Overview of the Wabash Tunnel
 – Southern portal
 – Northern portal
Wabash Tunnel at www.brooklineconnection.com
Airport Busway/Wabash HOV Environmental Impact Statement (includes plans for reopening the tunnel for automobile use)

Road tunnels in Pennsylvania
Railroad tunnels in Pennsylvania
Tunnels completed in 1903
Port Authority of Allegheny County